Proctocera quadriguttata is a species of beetle in the family Cerambycidae. It was described by Per Olof Christopher Aurivillius in 1914. It is known from Gabon, the Democratic Republic of the Congo, and Uganda.

References

Lamiinae
Beetles described in 1914
Taxa named by Per Olof Christopher Aurivillius